The 2011 Kerala Sahitya Akademi Award was announced on 2 August 2012. Writers T. Padmanabhan and Anand received the fellowships.

Winners

Fellowships
 T. Padmanabhan
 Anand

Endowments
I. C. Chacko Award: N. K. Mary (Malayala Vyakarana Sidhanthangal)
C. B. Kumar Award: S. Gopalakrishnan (Kathapole Chilathu Sambhavikkumbol)
K.R. Namboodiri Award: Thuravur Viswambharan (Mahabharatha Paryadanam Bharathadarsanam: Punarvayana)
Kanakasree Award: Aryambika S. V. (Thonniya Poloru Puzha)
Geetha Hiranyan Award: Dhanya Raj (Pachayude Album)
G. N. Pillai Award: Anniyil Tharakan (Bharatheeya Darsanam English Kavithayil)

References

Kerala Sahitya Akademi Awards
Kerala Sahitya Akademi Awards